Federal Route 69, or Jalan Bagan Datoh, is a federal road in Perak, Malaysia, connecting Simpang Empat Hutan Melintang to Bagan Datoh.

Route background
The Kilometre Zero of the Federal Route 69 starts at Simpang Empat Hutan Melintang.

Features

At most sections, the Federal Route 69 was built under the JKR R5 road standard, allowing maximum speed limit of up to 90 km/h.

List of junctions and towns

References

Malaysian Federal Roads